"Rich Love" is a song by American pop rock band OneRepublic and Norwegian EDM record production trio Seeb. The song was written by Brent Kutzle, Seeb and Ryan Tedder, with the latter two handling the song's production. The pop song was released on July 14, 2017, through Mosley Music Group and Interscope Records.

Critical reception
Sabrina Finkelstein of Billboard magazine described the drop as a "smooth and energetic tropical" one. "OneRepublic dabbling in dance music makes for a summer jam we can get behind!" Katrina Rees of CelebMix felt the song "infectious" and "showcases a slightly different side to OneRepublic". She called the song a "slick dance track" and a "stray-away" from OneRepublic's "typically anthemic sound" with Seeb's influence. Karlie Powell of YourEDM regarded the single as "another mainstream-ish song", and felt the song "almost too catchy thanks to OneRepublic's repertoire of hit-worthy pop music" and is "almost impossible to not sing along". Erik Mahal of EDM Sauce wrote that the vocals are "gorgeous" and "silky smooth and naturally flow with the gorgeous arrangements", and called the track "catchy" and "solid". He felt that the "melodic sections seem familiar" to Seeb's remix of "I Took a Pill in Ibiza", and that the song's originality cannot be retained. "There is nothing wrong on this one, we just know that Seeb could have brought a bit more." Kevin Apaza of Directlyrics called the verses and the chorus "very pop folk, Avicii-esque", while the post-chorus is "an EDM beat drop instrumental". He felt that the song "sounds somewhat generic as a whole".

Music video
The music video was directed by Isaac Rentz and currently has 53 million views.

Charts

Weekly charts

Year-end charts

Certifications

Release history

References

External links
 

2017 songs
2017 singles
OneRepublic songs
Seeb (music producers) songs
Songs written by Ryan Tedder
Songs written by Brent Kutzle
Interscope Records singles
Tropical house songs
Song recordings produced by Seeb (music producers)
Songs written by Espen Berg (musician)
Songs written by Simen Eriksrud